"Thanksgiving of Horror" is the eighth episode of the thirty-first season of the American animated television series The Simpsons, and the 670th episode overall. It aired in the United States on Fox on November 24, 2019. The episode was written by Dan Vebber, and was directed by Rob Oliver.

On February 1, 2020, Dan Vebber won the Writers Guild of America Award for Outstanding Writing in Animation at the 72nd Writers Guild of America Awards for his script to this episode and the episode was nominated for an Emmy in 2020 for Outstanding Animated Program.

This is the final episode featuring Russi Taylor, who had been with the show since the first season voicing characters such as Martin Prince, Sherri and Terri, and Uter, due to her death on July 26, 2019. Note that two prior episodes that aired were recorded after her death, with successor Grey Griffin already voicing the characters.

Plot
A Thanksgiving take on Treehouse of Horror looking at the past, present and future of the holiday. Turkeys are slaughtered by pilgrims during the first Thanksgiving, Homer purchases an A.I. based on Marge that resents the real one, and an already-dangerous space mission escaping a doomed Earth becomes worse when Bart's attempts to replicate cranberry sauce turn it into a sentient monster.

In the introduction, Marge informs the viewers that, because of the 'impending terror of everything', there are two Treehouse of Horror episodes this year. Homer complains about not knowing when to eat dinner on Thanksgiving, while Kang and Kodos appear dressed as seventeenth-century colonists and declare their intentions to take over the world.

A-Gobble-Ypto
In a parody of Apocalypto, the Simpson family and some other Springfield residents are depicted as turkeys, while others are depicted as Pilgrims. After Marge lays an egg, the latter hunt for their Thanksgiving dinner and Homer is among the turkeys captured; Bart escapes, but follows them back to their settlement. Several turkeys are bloodily killed, but a panic erupts when the turkey version of Grampa continues to run around with his head cut off. In the confusion, Bart rescues Homer and they reunite with their family, but are chased by Constable Wiggum until a bear mauls him to death. The egg then hatches to reveal a turkey version of Maggie. Upon watching some Pilgrims eat turkey dinner, Homer comments that times will be dark for them as Thanksgiving becomes a new human tradition.

The Fourth Thursday After Tomorrow
In a parody of the Black Mirror special, "White Christmas", to help Marge with the Thanksgiving cooking as the Simpsons are holding a dinner party for many of their friends, Homer orders an A.I. with all of her memories, who acts as the protagonist of this story. Marge becomes jealous as the A.I. proves better at running the family than her. She decides to delete her after the holiday. A.I. Marge finds out and, after cooking a huge and delicious meal that Marge takes credit for, tries to escape into the internet. She is nearly stymied by Marge, but convinces Maggie to help, showing that she is better at mothering than Marge herself. She also reveals to the guests that she cooked the meal before escaping, causing Marge's social rating to plummet. (a parody of another Black Mirror episode, "Nosedive"). Things are made worse when Homer tries to comfort her and inadvertently reveals himself as a robot, much to Marge's shock. Now free, the A.I. happily decides to spend some time in various places on the internet, starting with Etsy.

The Last Thanksgiving/The First Blarg-sgiving
In a parody of The Blob, Alien and Life, while on a spaceship years after the Earth's destruction, the kids are awoken from hibernation to do some work before landing on their new planet. Bart and Milhouse try to create a Thanksgiving dinner, but they can only find one can of cranberry sauce, which Bart tries to replicate and accidentally brings to life. The creature, being made of gelatin, eats bones, and soon kills every child except Bart, Lisa, Milhouse and Martin, the latter of whom betrays the others before allowing himself to be killed. Milhouse decides to befriend the monster, but is thrown aside by it instead, prompting Bart and Lisa to trick it into releasing Milhouse and launching itself into a large can. The two release the can into space, but it resists and damages the ship, causing it to crash on a nearby planet. Bart and Lisa reunite with Homer, Marge, Maggie and Santa's Little Helper, but not Snowball II, who died after her cryopod malfunctioned long ago, only for the creature to arrive on their new planet. Thankfully, the humans are aided by some native aliens, who make the monster into food, ending with an extraterrestrial version of the first Thanksgiving. Lisa then narrates that the monster happily found its true purpose: being fed to others, as the title card is renamed to "The First Blarg-sgiving".

Credits
During the credits, footage of the Bart Simpson balloon at the Macy's Thanksgiving Day Parade is shown.

Production
The run time of this episode is 24 minutes and 52 seconds, making it the longest single episode of The Simpsons ever aired. While The Great Phatsby was advertised and aired as a double-length episode three seasons earlier, it was actually produced as two separate episodes and then merged into one. The Fox press release for the episode stated that filmmaker Werner Herzog was going to again guest star in the episode as the character Walter Hotenhoffer, but he was not featured in the final broadcast.

The idea of doing a Thanksgiving version of a Treehouse of Horror episode was that of executive producer Matt Selman starting with the concept of doing Apocalypto with turkeys. The voice cast came up with the turkey's gobble language and the producers thought it would be funnier to just have them gobble without subtitles, believing the audience knew the characters well enough to more or less understand what they were saying. "We wanted it to feel like if you’re a turkey, Thanksgiving is pretty much a horror movie where you’re being hunted down and slaughtered," writer Dan Vebber stated.

The idea for the second segment was to make the audience root for the fake A.I. Marge over the real one and to try and cram in as many Black Mirror references and Easter eggs as possible. Black Mirror creator Charlie Brooker was asked to voice a social media app in the episode. Vebber said of the cameo, "I came up with the idea of having him voice a computer at the end to say ‘Firewall activated’ but Matt Selman lobbied for ‘social rating: falling.’ We disagreed on this until the day we recorded the voices, which was when I came up with the ‘nosediving’ reference from the show. It was the perfect compromise between what we both wanted."

For the final segment, the idea of the cranberry creature that sucked out the skeletons of the crew was inspired by the Star Trek episode, "The Man Trap", that featured an alien creature that sucked salt from the bodies of its victims. Vebber directed voice actress Russi Taylor for what would be her final performance as Martin Prince in "The Last Thanksgiving/The First Blarg-sgiving" segment. Taylor recorded her lines months before her death, and had been ill from cancer treatments during the previous recordings, but Vebber said during this final recording "She was so into it she was really just laughing her head off. She thought it was so funny that, at the end, Martin's entire skeleton just gets sucked out of him, and she really got into it, asking what the noises would be as he’s getting his skeleton sucked out. She was having the best time."

Reception
Dennis Perkins of The A.V. Club gave this episode a B, stating, "'Thanksgiving of Horror' represents the show's writers tossing out a 'Why not?' non-canonical scary story do-over. And, oddly enough, I'm fine with it, especially since this second, Thanksgiving-themed horror outing is scarier, meaner, grosser, and all-around better than this year's original."

This episode won the Writers Guild of America Award for Television: Animation at the 72nd Writers Guild of America Awards. It was also nominated for a Primetime Emmy Award for Outstanding Animated Program at the 72nd Primetime Creative Arts Emmy Awards, but lost to the Rick and Morty episode, "The Vat of Acid Episode".

References

External links

 

2019 American television episodes
The Simpsons (season 31) episodes
Thanksgiving television episodes
Television episodes about artificial intelligence
Television episodes set in outer space